Events from the year 1974 in South Korea.

Incumbents
President: Park Chung-hee 
Prime Minister: Kim Jong-pil

Events
November 3 – A massibie caught fire in Daewang Corner(대왕코너,大旺코너) complex building, Dongdaemun-gu, Seoul, 88 persons were their lost to lives, 35 persons were hurt, according to Seoul Fire Department official confirmed report.

Births
June 3 - Seo Jang-hoon, basketball player turned comedian/TV personality
December 7 - Kang Full

Deaths
August 15 - Yuk Young-soo, wife of Park Chung-hee
December 20 - Mun Segwang

See also
List of South Korean films of 1974

References

 
South Korea
Years of the 20th century in South Korea
1970s in South Korea
South Korea